The 2012 Yale Bulldogs football team represented Yale University in the 2012 NCAA Division I FCS football season. They were led by first year head coach Tony Reno and played their home games at the Yale Bowl. They are a member of the Ivy League. They finished the season 2–8, 1–6 in Ivy League play to finish in last place. Yale averaged 12,453 fans per game.

Schedule

Roster

References

Yale
Yale Bulldogs football seasons
Yale Bulldogs football